Ceratostigma, or leadwort, plumbago, is a genus of eight species of flowering plants in the family Plumbaginaceae, native to warm temperate to tropical regions of Africa and Asia. Common names are shared with the genus Plumbago.

Description 
The leaves are spirally arranged, simple, 1–9 cm long, usually with a hairy margin. Some of the species are evergreen, others deciduous. The flowers are produced in a compact inflorescence, each flower with a five-lobed corolla; flower colour varies from pale to dark blue to red-purple. The fruit is a small bristly capsule containing a single seed.

Selected species
Ceratostigma abyssinicum (Hochst.) Schwein. & Asch.
Ceratostigma griffithii C.B.Clarke
Ceratostigma minus Stapf ex Prain
Ceratostigma plumbaginoides (Bunge)
Ceratostigma ulicinum Prain
Ceratostigma willmottianum Stapf

Cultivation and uses
Plants of this genus are valued in the garden for their late summer flower colour and their autumn leaf colour. The following varieties have gained the Royal Horticultural Society's Award of Garden Merit (confirmed 2017): 
C. plumbaginoides 
C. willmottianum 
C. willmottianum ='Lice'

Notes

References

Sources 

 Flora of China: Ceratostigma
 Huxley, A., ed. (1992). New RHS Dictionary of Gardening. Macmillan.

 
Caryophyllales genera
Taxa named by Alexander von Bunge